Jori, Jodi, Dhamma, or Jorhi (sometimes Jori-Pakhawaj) is a South Asian percussion instrument made up of two individual drums. The Jori originates from the Punjab region of South Asia. Historically, the Jori has accompanied Gurbani Kirtan. Prominent exponents of the Jori include Ustad Sukhvinder Singh 'Pinky", ,Bhai Baldeep Singh, Bhai Jasdeep Singh, Bhai Surdarshan Singh and Bhai Gian Singh Naamdhari.

In its construction, the Jori is similar to the Tabla. The key differences being the use of a larger dayaan/chathoo (also known as Poorra) (treble drum), and a wooden barrel-shaped bayaan/dagga (bass drum) with atta (dough) instead of the syahi/gub, which is called a "Dhamma" .

History and origin 
The Jori, Jodi, or Jorhi was first created by the 5th Sikh guru, Guru Arjun Dev Ji when his followers wanted to separate the much older & venerable Pakhavaj into two instruments, similar to the tabla. Due to this, in modern times we notice the Tabla & Jori being confused as the same instrument, although these two instruments make completely different sounds, and the Jori is almost always much lower than the Tabla and does not produce a sharp sound. Visually the dayaan/chathoo (also known as Poorra) drum is quite similar to the tabla's dayaan/chathoo, but has a wider circumference. The way the instrument is played also differs, as with the Tabla a striking motion is used to produce a sharp sound, but an open hand, soft motion is used to produce sound on a Jori.

Former use in Gurbani & Kirtaan 

As a Sikh instrument, the Jori, also known as Punjab's Pakhawaj, was used alongside the rubab or rabab in Gurbani/Kirtan, which is a form of devotional prayer & singing in the Sikh religion. Over a gradual period of time, and especially after the Partition of Punjab in 1947, most rubab players (which have historically been Muslim since the times of the first Sikh Gurus) emigrated to Punjab, 

Pakistan. This took a way a key part of the Jori playing symphony, and the rebab was replaced with more canonically Indian instruments, such as the harmonium to replace missing melody. In the Darbar Sahib, which is seen as a spiritual center for Sikhs, the Rubab has been expelled as an instrument that can be played, thus diminishing the Jori's presence as an instrument used specifically in kirtan. It has since been replaced in most of these setting by the Tabla, but the similar appearance between these two instruments confuses many to this day, especially with comparison to Qawwali & Pakistani/Afghan Tablas, which use as larger Bayan/Dhamma for producing bass sounds (and also have a missing syahi/gub).

References 

Asian percussion instruments
Punjabi music
Indian musical instruments
Membranophones
Sikhism